Venustus is a genus of longhorn beetles of the subfamily Lamiinae, containing the following species:

 Venustus analogus Martins & Galileo, 1996
 Venustus zeteki Dillon & Dillon, 1945

References

Onciderini